Paavo Juhani Tirkkonen (2 December 1947 – 5 August 2012) was a Finnish ice hockey defenceman and Olympian.

Tirkkonen played with Team Finland at the 1968 Winter Olympics held in Grenoble, France. He previously played for SaPKo Savonlinna in SM-Liiga.

References

1947 births
2012 deaths
Finnish ice hockey defencemen
Ice hockey players at the 1968 Winter Olympics
Olympic ice hockey players of Finland
People from Savonlinna
Sportspeople from South Savo